The Best of Waylon Jennings is a compilation album by American country music artist Waylon Jennings, released in 1970 on RCA Nashville.

Background
The LP contains several hit singles that Jennings had scored during his first four years at RCA Victor, including "Only Daddy That'll Walk the Line."  In Europe, RCA added three songs to the album (including Waylon's then-current single, "Singer Of Sad Songs" and the #2 Chuck Berry cover "Brown Eyed Handsome Man"), making the European version slightly superior to the U.S. version.  In 1978, RCA reissued this album with revised cover art. Five years later, RCA issued an abridged (8-song) budget version eliminating "I Got You" and "Something's Wrong in California". In 1988, RCA reissued the original 10-song album on compact disc.  Although Jennings had attained chart success at RCA Victor, he felt stifled artistically, recalling in the audio version of his autobiography, "I never did feel at home.  I didn't know it yet but I was in trouble the minute I got there.  I found myself trying to fit in and having people wedge me into places where I didn't work.  I was being told over and over, 'You just don't do this' and 'You can't do that.  There's a certain way we do things in Nashville.  We know what's best for you.'"

Track listing (US Version)
"The Days of Sand and Shovels" (Doyle Marsh, George Reneau)
"MacArthur Park" (Jimmy Webb) (with The Kimberlys)
"Delia's Gone" (Waylon Jennings, Tommy Jennings)
"Walk on Out of My Mind" (Red Lane)
"Anita, You're Dreaming" (Don Bowman, Jennings)
"Only Daddy That'll Walk the Line" (Jimmy Bryant)
"Just to Satisfy You" (Bowman, Jennings)
"I Got You" (Gordon Galbraith, Ricci Mareno) (with Anita Carter)
"Something's Wrong in California" (Wayne Carson, Rodney Lay)
"Ruby, Don't Take Your Love to Town" (Mel Tillis)

Track listing (European Version)
"Love of the Common People" (Ronnie Wilkins, John Hurley)
"The Days Of Sand and Shovels" (Doyle Marsh, George Reneau)
"MacArthur Park" (Jimmy Webb) (with The Kimberlys)
"Delia's Gone" (Waylon Jennings, Tommy Jennings)
"Walk On Out of My Mind" (Red Lane)
"Anita, You're Dreaming" (Don Bowman, Jennings)
"Only Daddy That'll Walk the Line" (Jimmy Bryant)
"Just To Satisfy You" (Bowman, Jennings)
"I Got You" (Gordon Gaibraith, Ricci Mareno) (with Anita Carter)
"Something's Wrong In California" (Wayne Carson, Rodney Lay)
"Ruby, Don't Take Your Love To Town" (Mel Tillis)
"Brown-Eyed Handsome Man" (Chuck Berry)
"Singer Of Sad Songs" (Alex Zanetis)

Track listing (1983 U.S. Version)
"The Days Of Sand And Shovels" (Doyle Marsh/George Reneau)
"MacArthur Park" (Jimmy Webb) (with The Kimberlys)
"Delia's Gone" (Waylon Jennings/Tommy Jennings)
"Walk On Out Of My Mind" (Red Lane)
"Only Daddy That'll Walk The Line" (Jimmy Bryant)
"Just To Satisfy You" (Bowman/Jennings)
"Anita, You're Dreaming" (Don Bowman/Jennings)
"Ruby, Don't Take Your Love To Town" (Mel Tillis)

Waylon Jennings albums
1970 greatest hits albums
RCA Records compilation albums